Persatuan Sepakbola Abulyatama Aceh (simply known as PSAA Abulyatama) is an Indonesian football club based in Aceh Besar Regency, Aceh. They currently compete in the Liga 3 and their homeground is Mini PSAA Stadium.

References

External links

Aceh Besar Regency
Football clubs in Indonesia
 Football clubs in Aceh
Association football clubs established in 1989
1989 establishments in Indonesia